Adewale Ogunleye (born August 9, 1977) is a former American football defensive end who played eleven seasons in the National Football League (NFL).  He was signed by the Miami Dolphins as an undrafted free agent in 2000 and also played for the Chicago Bears and Houston Texans. He played college football at Indiana.

Early years
Ogunleye is of a Nigerian & Yoruba background. His paternal grandfather, Emmanuel Taiwo Ogunleye, later Oba Ogunleye II Amugbayanwo (1922-1974) was the Oba (Elemure) of the city-state of Emure in Ekiti State, thus making him an Omoba of the Yoruba people. His last name means "Ogun (the god of Iron) has honor."  His father is a social worker employed by the City of New York.

Ogunleye played high school football at Tottenville High School in his hometown of Staten Island, New York City, New York. He was a classmate of Major League baseball All Star starting pitcher Jason Marquis and a teammate of three-time Super Bowl winning offensive guard Joe Andruzzi.

College career
Ogunleye played college football at Indiana from 1996 to 1999. During his college career, Ogunleye set school records for sacks (34.5) and tackles for loss (64). Additionally, he accumulated 167 tackles, eight forced fumbles and three fumble recoveries. Ogunleye earned All-Big Ten honors in each of his final three seasons. He graduated with a degree in English.

In November 2014, Ogunleye was inducted into the Indiana Athletic Hall of Fame.

In May 2014, and after finishing his professional career in the NFL, Adewale went on to obtain a Master of Business Administration (MBA) from George Washington University in Washington D.C.

Professional career

Despite being projected as a first- or second-round NFL draft pick following his junior season in 1998, Ogunleye chose to return to Indiana for his senior season. During the 1999 season, he suffered a major knee injury, which ended his college career, and a staph infection, which caused him to lose 50 pounds. He was not selected in the 2000 NFL Draft.

Miami Dolphins
Following the 2000 Draft, Ogunleye signed with the Miami Dolphins as an undrafted free agent.  He spent the first year of his NFL career on injured reserve.  In 2001, Ogunleye had recovered well enough to lead the team during the preseason in sacks and that earned him a spot on the Dolphins’ 53-man roster.  By the end of his fourth season with the Miami Dolphins, Ogunleye had been voted starter in the 2004 NFL Pro Bowl.  He led the AFC with 15 sacks in the 2003-2004 NFL season.  He was given the Dan Marino Most Valuable Player of the year award, by the Miami Dolphins, that same season.

Chicago Bears
He was traded by the Dolphins to the Bears for wide receiver Marty Booker and a 3rd round pick in the 2005 NFL draft after holding out during the month of August before the 2004 NFL season.  Ogunleye quickly signed a record-breaking 6-year contract with the Bears. During the next six seasons Ogunleye became a mainstay on the Bears top-ranked defense.  During the 2005 NFL season, Ogunleye spearheaded the Bear's defensive line by recording ten sacks.  Ogunleye was named team captain and helped the Bears reach Super Bowl XLI in Miami during the 2006 season.

In 2008, Ogunleye was named the NFL Defensive Player of the Week for the week one after recording a safety and making a key fourth down stop against the Indianapolis Colts.

On December 20, 2009 in a game against the Baltimore Ravens, Ogunleye fractured his left fibula. He was placed on season-ending injured reserve on December 26.

Houston Texans

On September 14, 2010 Ogunleye signed a one-year tender with the Houston Texans  after his contract with the Chicago Bears had expired.  At the end of the 2011 season, Ogunleye would end his professional playing career.  He finished with 11 NFL seasons under his belt.  He finished with career totals of 389 Tackles, 67.5 Sacks, 17 forced fumbles, and 14 fumble recoveries, 2 safeties and 1 Interception.

NFL statistics

Key
 GP: games played
 COMB: combined tackles
 TOTAL: total tackles
 AST: assisted tackles
 SACK: sacks
 FF: forced fumbles
 FR: fumble recoveries
 FR YDS: fumble return yards 
 INT: interceptions
 IR YDS: interception return yards
 AVG IR: average interception return
 LNG: longest interception return
 TD: interceptions returned for touchdown
 PD: passes defensed

References

External links
Adewale Ogunleye on Myspace
Chicago Bears bio

1977 births
Living people
American sportspeople of Nigerian descent
Sportspeople from Brooklyn
Basketball players from New York City
Sportspeople from Staten Island
Players of American football from New York City
Nigerian players of American football
American football defensive ends
Indiana Hoosiers football players
Miami Dolphins players
Chicago Bears players
Houston Texans players
American Conference Pro Bowl players
American people of Yoruba descent
Yoruba sportspeople